SK Spolana Neratovice was a Czech football club located in Neratovice and sponsored by Spolana. The club was founded in 1919. The club won the Bohemian Football League in the 1998–99 season and subsequently played four seasons in the Czech 2. Liga. After losing the support of the town and main sponsor Spolana, the club finished in 13th place in the 2002–03 Czech 2. Liga. The club subsequently merged with SK Kladno.

Historical names
 1919 – SK Neratovice (Sportovní klub Neratovice)
 1953 – DSO Jiskra Neratovice (Dobrovolná sportovní organizace Jiskra Neratovice)
 1959 – TJ Spolana Neratovice (Tělovýchovná jednota Spolana Neratovice)
 1997 – SK Spolana Neratovice (Sportovní klub Spolana Neratovice)
 2003 – merger with SK Kladno => disbandment

Honours
Bohemian Football League (third tier)
 Champions 1998–99

References

Association football clubs established in 1919
Association football clubs disestablished in 2003
2003 disestablishments in the Czech Republic
Neratovice, Spolana
Neratovice, Spolana
Mělník District